Malygina Strait or Malygin Strait in Siberia, Russia is an 9 to 30km wide, approximately 60 km long sound which is frozen most of the year.  It separates Bely Island from the Yamal Peninsula in the Yamalo-Nenets Autonomous Okrug, Tyumen Oblast. The strait is named after explorer Stepan Malygin, who was the first to make an instrumental mapping of its coasts during the Great Northern Expedition in the 18th century.

References 

Bodies of water of Tyumen Oblast
Bodies of water of Yamalo-Nenets Autonomous Okrug
Straits of Russia